The Democratic Party (abbreviation: DP) was a short-lived political party in Singapore that was registered on 11 February 1955 by the people from the Mandarin-speaking bourgeois who were members of the Chinese Chamber of Commerce.

History
At the time, it was one of the two largest parties in Singapore (The other party was Progressive Party (PP), who won the 1948 elections) as both parties had sent more than 20 candidates out of the total 25 seats before the emergence of Labour Front who became the ruling party after the 1955 elections (That sent 17 candidates and won 10 of them) and the People's Action Party that was the ruling party of Singapore after 1959 elections.

Despite being the two largest parties in Singapore, the Democratic and Progressive parties decided to merge in order to form the Liberal Socialist Party (LSP) at 5 February 1956, only to be wound up a few years later.

See also
Progressive Party
Liberal Socialist Party
Singapore Democratic Party
Workers' Party

References

Defunct political parties in Singapore
Political parties established in 1955
Political parties disestablished in 1956
1955 establishments in Singapore
1956 disestablishments in Singapore